Inglenook is a census-designated place (CDP) in the town of New Fairfield, Fairfield County, Connecticut, United States. It is in the northeast part of the town, atop a broad peninsula in Candlewood Lake. It is bordered to the east by Sail Harbor and to the north by the town of Sherman.

Inglenook was first listed as a CDP prior to the 2020 census.

References 

Census-designated places in Fairfield County, Connecticut
Census-designated places in Connecticut